Richard Evert Björnson Tötterman (10 October 1926, Helsinki – 11 December 2020) was a Finnish lawyer and diplomat.

Education
Tötterman studied law at the University of Helsinki, gaining a Licentiate of Law degree in 1949.

He continued his studies at Oxford, earning a DPhil in 1951 with his thesis titled "The scope of the rule locus regit actum in the conflict of laws".

Career
Tötterman served as the Permanent Secretary of the President of Finland from 1966 to 1970, and of the Ministry for Foreign Affairs from 1970 to 1975.

This was followed by Ambassadorships to London (1975–1983) and Bern (1983–1990).

He also played a key role in organising the CSCE summit, leading to the Helsinki Accords in 1975.

Awards and honours
In 1982, Tötterman was made Honorary Fellow of his alma mater, Brasenose College.

He was made Commander of the Order of the White Rose of Finland.

Tötterman was also awarded honorary OBE in 1961, as well as Knight (1969) and Knight Grand Cross (1976) of the Royal Victorian Order, among many other Finnish and international decorations.

References

Ambassadors of Finland to the United Kingdom
Lawyers from Helsinki
Ambassadors of Finland to Switzerland
1926 births
2020 deaths
Diplomats from Helsinki
University of Helsinki alumni
Alumni of the University of Oxford